An induced thymic epithelial cell (iTEC) is a cell that has been induced to become a thymic epithelial cell.

References

Stem cells
Thymus
Organ transplantation